Orthotylus intricatus is a species of bug in the Miridae family that is endemic to North Aegean islands.

References

Insects described in 1975
Endemic fauna of North Aegean islands
intricatus